The 1995 Campionati Internazionali di Sicilia was a men's tennis tournament played on outdoor clay courts in Palermo, Italy that was part of the World Series of the 1995 ATP Tour. It was the 17th edition of the tournament and took place from 25 September until 1 October 1995. Fifth-seeded Francisco Clavet won the singles title.

Finals

Singles

 Francisco Clavet defeated  Jordi Burillo 6–7(2–7), 6–3, 7–6(7–1)
 It was Clavet's 1st singles title of the year and the 2nd of his career.

Doubles

 Àlex Corretja /  Fabrice Santoro defeated  Hendrik Jan Davids /  Piet Norval 6–7, 6–4, 6–3

References

External links
 ITF tournament edition details

Campionati Internazionali di Sicilia
Campionati Internazionali di Sicilia
Campionati Internazionali di Sicilia